Hotel Paso del Norte is a historic 351-room luxury 4 1/2 star hotel. It is located in El Paso, Texas, less than one mile north of the international border with Mexico. The hotel originally opened on Thanksgiving Day 1912, and was designed by Trost & Trost.  The building was added to the National Register of Historic Places on January 5, 1979. It recently underwent a complete and total renovation, and reopened its doors as part of Marriott's Autograph Collection on October 8, 2020.

A wealthy El Paso businessman, Zack T. White, financed initial construction of the hotel. After witnessing a fire destroy another hotel in El Paso, White and architect Henry Charles Trost traveled to San Francisco, California to try to understand how some buildings there survived the earthquake and fire in 1906. The hotel cost $1.5 million to build in order to make it one of the sturdiest structures in El Paso and the most ornate. The large hotel lobby features a stained glass dome over forty-five feet in diameter designed in the Tiffany glass style.

During the 1914 Mexican Revolution, it was popular to watch firefights between the revolutionaries and the Mexican Army from the terraces on the roof of the hotel. Some of the most notable people who have stayed at the hotel over its 100+ year history include U.S. Presidents G.H.W. Bush, G.W. Bush, Lyndon Johnson, Richard Nixon, William Howard Taft, Herbert Hoover, and Franklin Delano Roosevelt. Other notables include Gloria Swanson, General John J. "Black Jack" Pershing, Pancho Villa, Will Rogers, Enrico Caruso, Amelia Earhart, Sandra Day O’Connor, Gregory Peck, Harrison Ford, Colin Powell, Charles Lindbergh, Clark Gable, John Wayne, Jack Dempsey, U2, Van Halen, Aerosmith, Peter Frampton, The Grateful Dead, Pink Floyd, The Rolling Stones, Dallas Cowboys, Golden State Warriors, George Strait, Kenny Rogers, Gloria Estefan, and a host of other well known actors, musicians, celebrities and government officials.

The hotel was sold several times during the 20th century.  In 1986, a 17-story addition was constructed on the north side of the hotel. The Mexican hotel group Camino Real Hotels, who operated it as The Camino Real for 30 years, sold the building to The Meyers Group in October 2016.

The Meyers Group renovated the historically renamed Hotel Paso Del Norte with local El Paso development partner Two Sabes LLC.

See also

National Register of Historic Places listings in El Paso County, Texas

References

External links

Official site
Description and history at Historic Hotels of America

Autograph Collection Hotels
Hotels in Texas
Buildings and structures in El Paso, Texas
Commercial buildings completed in 1912
National Register of Historic Places in El Paso County, Texas
1912 establishments in Texas
Trost & Trost buildings
Beaux-Arts architecture in Texas
Hotel buildings on the National Register of Historic Places in Texas
Skyscrapers in El Paso, Texas
Skyscraper hotels in Texas
Chicago school architecture in Texas